The 2016 Cavan Senior Football Championship was the 108th edition of Cavan GAA's premier club Gaelic football tournament for senior graded teams in County Cavan, Ireland. The tournament consists of 16 teams, with the winner going on to represent Cavan in the Ulster Senior Club Football Championship. The championship starts with a group stage and then progresses to a knock out stage. The draw for the group stages of the championship were made on 11 April 2016.

Kingscourt Stars were the defending champions, but were dethroned by Ramor United at the quarter-final stage.

The final was played on 9 October 2016, but the game ended in a draw. On 23 October 2016, Ramor United claimed their fourth title, beating Castlerahan after a replay and thus bridging a 24-year gap since their last triumph.

Format
For the 2016 season the championship will take a Group stage progressing to a knock-out stage format rather than the back-door system used in previous years. The 16 clubs will be divided into 4 groups of 4 with 2 teams in each group to be seeded. The top 2 in each group progress to the quarter-finals while the bottom placed team in each group enter a Relegation Playoff with 3 teams to be relegated to the 2017 Intermediate Championship. This will leave 14 clubs to participate in the 2017 Senior Championship.

Team Changes
The following teams have changed division since the 2015 championship season.

To Championship
Promoted from 2015 Cavan Intermediate Football Championship
  Ballyhaise  -  (Intermediate Champions)

From Championship
Relegated to 2016 Cavan Intermediate Football Championship
  Drumalee
  Drumgoon

Group stage
All 16 teams enter the competition at this stage in 4 groups of 4. Two teams in each group are seeded. Seeds are determined by the 8 teams which reached the quarter-final the previous year. They are:

 Castlerahan
 Cavan Gaels
 Killeshandra
 Killygarry
 Kingscourt Stars
 Lacken
 Mullahoran
 Ramor United

The top 2 teams in each group go into the quarter-finals while the bottom team of each group will enter a Relegation Playoff.

Group A

Round 1

Round 2

Round 3

Quarter-Final play-off::

Group BRound 1Round 2Round 3Preliminary relegation play-offGroup CRound 1Round 2Round 3Preliminary relegation play-offGroup DRound 1Round 2Round 3'''

Knock-Out Stages

Quarter-finals

Semi-finals

Final

Relegation play-offs

Relegation Semi-Finals
The bottom placed team in each group play each other. The 2 winners will progress to the Relegation Final while the 2 losers will be relegated to the 2017 Intermediate Championship.

Relegation Final
The 2 winners of the Relegation Round 1 play each other. The winner retains their Senior status for 2017 while the loser will be relegated to the 2017 Intermediate Championship.

References

External links
 Cavan at ClubGAA
 Official Cavan GAA Website

Cavan Senior Football Championship
Cavan Senior Football Championship